The River Parrett Trail is a long-distance footpath that can be used for walking, jogging, or running, following the route of the River Parrett in Somerset, England.

It passes many landmarks and places of interest including; Burrow Hill Cider Farm, Muchelney Abbey, West Sedgemoor (a Site of Special Scientific Interest (SSSI), the Blake Museum, Westonzoyland Pumping Station Museum, the site of the Battle of Sedgemoor and finally discharging into Bridgwater Bay (another SSSI).

The trail is managed by The Parrett Trail Partnership, a consortium of agencies including:
Arts Council England, South West, British Waterways, Cannington Agricultural College, Country Land and Business Association, Natural England, Environment Agency, National Farmers Union, Royal Society for the Protection of Birds, Sedgemoor District Council, Somerset County Council, Somerset Wildlife Trust, South Somerset District Council, South West Tourism, Take Art!, Somerset West and Taunton District Council and Dorset Council.

Route and points of interest
The following table lists key points of interest along the river.

References

External links
Official River Parrett Trail website
River Parrett Trail at the Long Distance Walkers Association
The River Parrett Trail (re)visited - website encouraging arts related to the trail

Long-distance footpaths in Dorset
Footpaths in Somerset